A sailor, seaman, mariner, or seafarer is a person who works aboard a watercraft as part of its crew, and may work in any one of a number of different fields that are related to the operation and maintenance of a ship.

The profession of the sailor is old, and the term sailor has its etymological roots in a time when sailing ships were the main mode of transport at sea, but it now refers to the personnel of all watercraft regardless of the mode of transport, and encompasses people who operate ships professionally, be it for a military navy or civilian merchant navy, as a sport or recreationally. In a navy, there may be further distinctions: sailor may refer to any member of the navy even if they are based on land; while seaman may refer to a specific enlisted rank.

Professional mariners
Seafarers hold a variety of professions and ranks, each of which carries unique responsibilities which are integral to the successful operation of an ocean-going vessel. A ship's crew can generally be divided into four main categories: the deck department, the engineering department, the steward's department, and others.

Deck department

 Officer positions in the deck department include but are not limited to: master and his chief, second and third officers. The official classifications for unlicensed members of the deck department are able seaman and ordinary seaman. With some variation, the chief mate is most often charged with the duties of cargo mate. Second Mates are charged with being the medical officer in case of a medical emergency. All three mates each do four-hour morning and afternoon shifts on the bridge, when underway at sea.

A common deck crew for a ship includes:
 (1) Captain / Master
 (1) Chief Officer / First Mate
 (1) Second Officer / Second Mate
 (1) Third Officer / Third Mate
 (1) Boatswain (unlicensed Petty Officer: Qualified member Deck Dept.)
 (2) Able seamen (unlicensed qualified rating)
 (2) Ordinary seamen (entry-level rating)
 (0-1) Deck Cadet / unlicensed Trainee navigator / Midshipman

Engineering department

A ship's engineering department consists of the members of a ship's crew that operates and maintains the propulsion and other systems on board the vessel. Marine engineering staff also deal with the "hotel" facilities on board, notably the sewage, lighting, air conditioning and water systems. Engineering staff manages bulk fuel transfers, from a fuel-supply barge in port. When underway at sea, the second and third engineers will often be occupied with oil transfers from storage tanks, to active working tanks. Cleaning of oil purifiers is another regular task. Engineering staff is required to have training in firefighting and first aid. Additional duties include maintaining the ship's boats and performing other nautical tasks. Engineers play a key role in cargo loading/discharging gear and safety systems, though the specific cargo discharge function remains the responsibility of deck officers and deck workers.

A common engineering crew for a ship includes:
 (1) Chief Engineer
 (1) Second Engineer / First Assistant Engineer
 (1) Third Engineer / Second Assistant Engineer
 (1) Fourth Engineer / Third Assistant Engineer
 (1) Motorman (unlicensed Junior Engineer: Qualified member Engine Dept.)
 (2) Oiler (unlicensed qualified rating)
 (2) Entry-level rating Wiper
 (0–1) Engine Cadet / unlicensed Trainee engineer

American ships also carry a qualified member of the engine department. Other possible positions include motorman, machinist, electrician, refrigeration engineer and tankerman.

Steward's department

A typical steward's department for a cargo ship is a chief steward, a chief cook and a steward's assistant. All three positions are typically filled by unlicensed personnel.

The chief steward directs, instructs, and assigns personnel performing such functions as preparing and serving meals; cleaning and maintaining officers' quarters and steward department areas; and receiving, issuing, and inventorying stores.

The chief steward also plans menus, compiles supply, overtime, and cost control records. The steward may requisition or purchase stores and equipment. Galley's roles may include baking.

A chief steward's duties may overlap with those of the steward's assistant, the chief cook, and other Steward's department crewmembers.

A person in the United States Merchant Marine has to have a Merchant Mariner's Document issued by the United States Coast Guard in order to serve as a chief steward. All chief cooks who sail internationally are similarly documented by their respective countries because of international conventions and agreements.

The only time that steward department staff are charged with duties outside the steward department is during the execution of the fire and boat drill.

Other departments

Various types of staff officer positions may exist on board a ship, including junior assistant purser, senior assistant purser, purser, chief purser, medical doctor, professional nurse, marine physician assistant, and hospital corpsman. In the USA these jobs are considered administrative positions and are therefore regulated by Certificates of Registry issued by the United States Coast Guard. Pilots are also merchant marine officers and are licensed by the Coast Guard.

Working conditions
Mariners spend extended periods at sea. Most deep-sea mariners are hired for one or more voyages that last for several months. There is no job security after that. The length of time between voyages varies by job availability and personal preference.

The rate of unionization for these workers in the United States is about 36 percent, much higher than the average for all occupations. Consequently, merchant marine officers and seamen, both veterans and beginners, are hired for voyages through union hiring halls or directly by shipping companies. Hiring halls fill jobs by the length of time the person has been registered at the hall and by their union seniority. Hiring halls typically are found in major seaports.

At sea, on larger vessels members of the deck department usually stand watch for four hours and are off for eight hours, seven days a week.

Mariners work in all weather conditions. Working in damp and cold conditions often is inevitable, although ships try to avoid severe storms while at sea. It is uncommon for modern vessels to suffer disasters such as fire, explosion, or a sinking. Yet workers face the possibility of having to abandon ship on short notice if it collides with other vessels or runs aground. Mariners also risk injury or death from falling overboard and from hazards associated with working with machinery, heavy loads, and dangerous cargo. However, modern safety management procedures, advanced emergency communications, and effective international rescue systems place modern mariners in a much safer position.

Most newer vessels are air conditioned, soundproofed from noisy machinery, and equipped with comfortable living quarters. These amenities have helped ease the sometimes difficult circumstances of long periods away from home. Also, modern communications such as email, instant messaging and social media platforms link modern mariners to their families. Nevertheless, some mariners dislike the long periods away from home and the confinement aboard ship. They consequently leave the profession.

Life at sea

Professional mariners live on the margins of society, with much of their life spent beyond the reach of land. They face cramped, stark, noisy, and dangerous conditions at sea. Yet men and women still go to sea. For some, the attraction is a life unencumbered with the restraints of life ashore. Seagoing adventure and a chance to see the world also appeal to many seafarers. Whatever the calling, those who live and work at sea invariably confront social isolation.

Findings by the Seafarer's International Research Center indicate a leading cause of mariners leaving the industry is "almost invariably because they want to be with their families". U.S. merchant ships typically do not allow family members to accompany seafarers on voyages. Industry experts increasingly recognize isolation, stress, and fatigue as occupational hazards. Advocacy groups such as International Labor Organization, a United Nations agency, and the Nautical Institute seek improved international standards for mariners.

One's service aboard ships typically extends for months at a time, followed by protracted shore leave. However, some seamen secure jobs on ships they like and stay aboard for years. In rare cases, veteran mariners choose never to go ashore when in port.

Further, the quick turnaround of many modern ships, spending only a matter of hours in port, limits a seafarer's free-time ashore. Moreover, some seafarers entering U.S. ports from a watch list of 25 countries deemed high-risk face restrictions on shore leave due to security concerns in a post 9/11 environment. However, shore leave restrictions while in U.S. ports impact American seamen as well. For example, the International Organization of Masters, Mates & Pilots notes a trend of U.S. shipping terminal operators restricting seamen from traveling from the ship to the terminal gate. Further, in cases where transit is allowed, special "security fees" are at times assessed.

Such restrictions on shore leave coupled with reduced time in port by many ships translate into longer periods at sea. Mariners report that extended periods at sea living and working with shipmates who for the most part are strangers takes getting used to. At the same time, there is an opportunity to meet people from a wide range of ethnic and cultural backgrounds. Recreational opportunities have improved aboard some U.S. ships, which may feature gyms and day rooms for watching movies, swapping sea stories, and other activities. And in some cases, especially tankers, it is made possible for a mariner to be accompanied by members of his family. However, a mariner's off-duty time at sea is largely a solitary affair, pursuing hobbies, reading, writing letters, and sleeping.

Internet accessibility is fast coming to the sea with the advent of cheap satellite communication, mainly from Inmarsat. The availability of affordable roaming SIM cards with online top-up facilities have also contributed to improved connection with friends and family at home.

Notable mariners

Erik the Red and his son Leif Erikson were the first notable mariners known to sail in a primitive, partly man powered vessel across the Arctic and the North Atlantic Ocean.

Barbarossa Hayrettin Pasha (Turkish: Barbaros Hayrettin Paşa or Hızır Hayrettin Paşa; also Hızır Reis before being promoted to the rank of Pasha and becoming the Kaptan-ı Derya (Fleet Admiral) of the Ottoman Navy) (c. 1478 – 4 July 1546) was an Ottoman admiral who dominated the Mediterranean for decades. He was born on the island of Lesbos/ Mytilini and died in Istanbul, the Ottoman capital.

Merchant seamen have gone on to make their mark on the world in a number of interesting ways. Traian Băsescu, who started his career as a third mate in 1976 was the president of Romania from 2004 to 2014. Arthur Phillip joined the Merchant Navy in 1751 and 37 years later founded the city of Sydney, Australia. Merchant mariner Douglass North went from seaman to navigator to winner of the 1993 Nobel Prize in Economics. Jimmy Carter went on to become the 39th president of the United States after service in the US Navy.

Members of the British Merchant Navy have won the Distinguished Service Cross and have had careers taking them from 'Deck Boy Peter' to Air Marshal Sir Beresford Peter Torrington Horsley KCB, CBE, LVO, AFC. Canadian merchant seamen have won the Victoria Cross and the Medal of Honor. American merchant seamen have won the Medal of Honor in the Korean War and Vietnam War, and one went on to become the "Father of the American Navy." One doesn't have to look far to find merchant seamen who became war heroes in Scotland, France, New Zealand, Peru, or Denmark.

Since World War II, a number of merchant seamen have become notorious criminals. American William Colepaugh was convicted as a Nazi spy in World War II and Fritz Sauckel was convicted as a Nazi war criminal. Briton Duncan Scott-Ford was hanged for treachery in World War II. George Hennard was an American mass murderer who claimed 23 victims on a rampage at Luby's Cafeteria in Killeen, Texas. And Perry Smith's own murderous rampage was made famous in Truman Capote's non-fiction novel In Cold Blood.

Mariners are well represented in the visual arts. French pilot's assistant Paul Gauguin later became a leading post-impressionist painter and pioneered modern art's synthetist style. American seaman Haskell Wexler later won two Academy Awards, the latter for a biography of his shipmate Woody Guthrie. British Merchant Navy member Ken Russell later directed films such as Tommy, Altered States and The Lair of the White Worm. Merchant seaman Johnny Craig was already a working comic book artist before he joined up, but Ernie Schroeder wouldn't start drawing comics until after returning home from World War II.

Merchant sailors have also made a splash in the world of sport. In football, with Fred Blackburn in England and the likes of Dan Devine and Heisman Trophy winner Frank Sinkwich in the U.S. In track and field, American seamen Cornelius Johnson and Jim Thorpe both won Olympic medals, though Thorpe didn't get his until 30 years after his death. Seamen Jim Bagby, Jr. and Charlie Keller went on to Major League Baseball. Drew Bundini Brown was Muhammad Ali's assistant trainer and cornerman, and Joe Gold went on to make his fortune as the bodybuilding and fitness guru of Gold's Gym.

Other sporting notables include Dutchman Henk de Velde known for sailing solo around the world, and Briton Matthew Webb who was the first person to swim the English Channel without the use of artificial aid.

Irish Merchant Navy member Kevin McClory spent 14 days in a lifeboat and later went on to write the James Bond movies Never Say Never Again and Thunderball. Members of the American Beat Movement Allen Ginsberg, Jack Kerouac, Bob Kaufman, and Herbert Huncke were all Merchant Mariners.

It is perhaps not surprising that the writers of Moby Dick, The American Practical Navigator, and Two Years Before the Mast were Merchant Mariners. It might be surprising that the writers of Borat, A Hard Day's Night, and Cool Hand Luke were.

A number of U.S. Merchant Mariners from World War II later played well known television characters. The list includes Milburn Drysdale on The Beverly Hillbillies, Archie Bunker on All in the Family, Peter Falk on Columbo, Jim Rockford on The Rockford Files, Steve McGarret on Hawaii Five-O, Uncle Jesse Duke on The Dukes of Hazzard and Cheyenne Bodie on Cheyenne.

Other uses

An ancient term, the word "sailor" has come to mean many things. Sailor may refer to:
 A person who is under sail and not on a vessel with motorized power of any kind in the Royal Navy,
 A person who goes out sailing, boating or yachting,
 A person who practices the art of controlling the motion of a sailing ship or sailboat across a body of water,
 A member of a military naval force,
 Anyone on a boat,
 Anyone from a recruit to an admiral in a navy or coast guard,
 Members of the deck department as opposed to members of other departments in the Merchant Navy.

See also

 Airman
 Astronaut
 British Merchant Navy
 Marines
 Sailing
 Sailing (sport)
 Glossary of nautical terms (A-L)
 Glossary of nautical terms (M-Z)
 Glossary of oilfield jargon
 Roughneck
 Sailor suit
 Seafarer's professions and ranks
 Seaman
 The Marine Society
 United States Merchant Marine
 Ocean rowing

Notes

References

External links

 Survey of Water Transport Occupations
 Seafarer Fatigue: The Cardiff Research Programme
 Sailor at Etymology Online
 The Telegraph, Sea no evil: the life of a modern sailor

Nautical terminology
 
Water transport
Military specialisms
Marine occupations